Exploits Valley (Botwood) Airport  is located  west southwest of Botwood, Newfoundland and Labrador, Canada.

The airport has no facilities (ATC/tower is at Gander) and is lighted.

Prior to this airport, Botwood's only other airport was a seaplane base built within what was RCAF Station Botwood in 1935. Expanded in 1940 during World War II and ceased operations in 1946. The former seaplane base is now home to Botwood Flying Boat Museum.

References

Registered aerodromes in Newfoundland and Labrador